Dillon station is a train station in Dillon, South Carolina, served by Amtrak, the United States' railroad passenger system. It was originally built by the Florence Railroad in 1893, but only as a freight station. Once the railroad was consolidated into the Atlantic Coast Line Railroad in 1898, the passenger station was opened in 1904. The station survived the merger of the Atlantic Coast Line and Seaboard Air Line Railroads into the Seaboard Coast Line Railroad in 1967, only to terminate passenger service in 1971. Amtrak service to Dillon began on June 15, 1976, with the introduction of the Palmetto. The four-faced station clock also contains two Fahrenheit thermometers.

Gallery

References

External links

Dillon Amtrak Station (USA Rail Guide -- Train Web)

Amtrak stations in South Carolina
Atlantic Coast Line Railroad stations
Railway stations in the United States opened in 1904